is a type of silk fabric traditionally produced in Japan; it is durable, hard-faced, and somewhat stiff, with a slight sheen, and slubbiness is deliberately emphasised.  was first produced in the late 19th century, and became widely popular during the 1920s and 30s (late-Taishō to early-Shōwa period), when it was mass-produced and ready-to-wear kimono began to be sold in Japan.  is commonly dyed using  (Japanese ikat) techniques, and features what were then overtly modern, non-traditional designs and colours.  remained popular through to the 1950s.

Between 1910 and 1925 (late Taishō to Shōwa period), the ability to spin as well as weave noil by machine (see ) was developed into mass production. Prices dropped drastically, and silk cloth and clothing was suddenly within the budget of most Japanese (who had previously worn , domesticated bast fibre, or cotton; see ).

Materials, spinning and weaving

Silk naturally comes in extremely long filaments (more than a kilometer and a half long), one per silkworm cocoon. Some filaments get broken in processing, or were collected, already broken, from wild. These shorter threads are called silk noil. Traditionally, the long silk was used for high-status garments, often legally reserved for the upper classes, but the lower classes could use noil. The noil was joined by hand-plying the ends or by spinning the noil into thread, as short-staple fibers are spun. Handspun noil was not twisted tightly. Cloth made from noil using Japanese hand methods is called tsumugi.  is slubbed, rough-surfaced, soft and drapey, softening further with age.

As the textile industry in Japan industrialized in the late 19th century, large amounts of silk were produced for export. Silk noil was not exported, so there was an abundant supply. Initially, only the filament silk could be made into cloth in a mechanized manner; noil had to be handspun. Attempts were made to machine-spin and machine-weave noil, and techniques gradually improved. These new machine-made slubbed silks were called .

 was spun tightly, with many more twists per unit length. It is stiff and crisp, with a glossy, hard, resilient surface, and wears well.

Dyeing and patterning

 was generally dyed with bright new aniline dyes, which were cheaper and faster to use than traditional plant-based dyes. Unlike in Meiji-period clothing, no attempt was made to match the colours of the older dyes; vivid, obviously synthetic shades were commonly used.

Initially,  was produced in plain colours or simple stripes.

While traditional  involved tying bundles of threads and dying them by hand,  was often patterned using less labour-intensive techniques. These produced -style blurred edges to the patterns, but with lower labour costs than hand-tying. Later, techniques for stencil-dyeing the weft threads were invented, and then techniques for dying both warp and weft. The dyes were mixed with rice paste or a similar starchy paste before being squeegeed over the stencils.

These thread-dying techniques produce a double-sided pattern, unlike painting or printing cloth, so when a  garment begins to show wear on the outside, it can be resewn with the panels flipped inside-to-out.

Motifs may be taken from portions of traditional patterns, and are largely abstract, often bold, geometric, or with op-art-like dazzle effects. Designs included exotic motifs like stained glass patterns, Egyptian patterns, exotic birds, and exotic flowers like roses and tulips, and were influenced by imported movies. Designs are often Western-influenced, including by the Art Nouveau, Modernist, Expressionist, Art Deco, and Arts and Crafts movements, which had in turn been influenced by Japanese art.

Industry
The market was highly competitive and had a rapid pace of technical innovation. New designs were produced each season, and advertised as defining specific "looks" and social meanings; department store requested specific patterns, made fashion forecasts, and gave marketing advice. Networks of wholsalers at various geographic scales formed.

After the military, the textile industry lead Japanese industrialisation. Initially, there were government subsidies and substantial government ownership. In 1882, government had just begun to privatise major enterprises, and textile mills made up half of private factories and employed  of factory workers. Textile workers increasingly became mostly female. In the Taishō period, many workers were daughters of well-off farm families and the former ruling class, but later they came mostly from poor peasant families.

Use and survival
In the 1870s,  was worn by geisha for informal gatherings.

 garments were often lined with lightweight cloth, from cheaper fibres like cotton or cupro. These were usually not treated with fibre-damaging sizing, as more expensive cloth often was, improving the chances of the garments surviving.

Cheap, bright, hard-wearing  kimonos boomed during the economic downturn. It is estimated that, in the late 1920s, over 70% of Japanese women owned one or more.

 was extremely popular in its day, especially among newly-financially-independent women, before abruptly going out of fashion. This abrupt unfashionalbleness helped preserve many meisen garments. Boldly-patterned  is periodically popular with  enthusiasts.

See also
, the traditional bolt of cloth used for making kimono
, traditional Japanese ikat dyework
, a rougher, softer, less-uniform slubby noil cloth.

References

External links

Meisen Kimono exhibit at the Anna Leonowens Gallery, Haruko Watanabe's collection 
Photogallery of  garments from that exhibit: 

Textile arts of Japan
Industrialisation